The Instituto de Tecnologia Intuitiva e Bioarquitetura (English: Institute of Intuitive Technology and Bio-Architecture), or TIBÁ, is an eco-centre located in the coastal jungle of Brazil (Mata Atlântica), dedicated to demonstrating and teaching sustainable development and "barefoot" construction techniques.

It was founded in 1987 by Rose and Johan van Lengen, author of the grassroots construction manual, The Barefoot Architect. The book has gained worldwide popularity with its advocacy of, and detailed instruction on, appropriate technology and natural building techniques for builders, architects, and students.

The name TIBÁ comes from a Tupi language (Brazilian Amazonian tribe) expression meaning "a place where many people meet".

History
Johan van Lengen was born in Amsterdam in 1930. He graduated from a course in architecture at the University of Oregon. He found work for the UN and the Secretariat of Social Development, and worked on re-urbanization in Brazil. In 1987, Johan and his wife Rose bought an old coffee plantation in Bom Jardim with the intent of starting the institute.

Immediately the two started several constructions and a reforestation project. The bio-architecture school was established to provide a place in which students can share and learn these techniques hands-on. The school began to attract many students, and a program of workshops was developed.

Since 2015 TIBA has been directed by Marc van Lengen, Johan`s oldest son and Aga Probala. Through the wide range of educational courses and programs the institute continues to bring people together in a soul-and mind-nourishing setting, aiming to inspire and create a sustainable future.

Workshops 
Various workshops are held year round in sustainable construction (so called bio-construction), agroforestry, sanitation, communication and education.

Specialist workshops held throughout the year include:
 Bio-Architecture Techniques, such as earth construction, bamboo construction, ferro-concrete, composting toilets, greywater reuse/biological filters, and green roofs
 Earth Construction Techniques, including: adobe, rammed earth, wattle and daub, cob, superadobe, natural paints/pigments, and natural finishes/plasters
 Bamboo Construction (instructed by Jörg Stamm, master carpenter of the Green School in Bali) 
 Agroforestry, as taught by Ernst Götsch
 Plantas Alimentícias Não Convencionais, an academic and popular movement in Brazil propagating unconventional edible plants
 Introduction to Permaculture

See also

 Appropriate Technology
 Natural Building
 Ecological Sanitation
 Green Building
 Sustainable Architecture
 Vernacular Architecture
 Sustainable Agriculture
 Forest Gardening
 Forest Farming
 Agroforestry

References

Sustainability in Brazil
Waste organizations
Renewable energy organizations
Appropriate technology organizations